Thirparappu Waterfalls is located near Kulasekharam town in Kanyakumari district, Tamil Nadu state, India. 

The Kodayar River makes its descent at Thiruparappu. It is just a 15 min drive from the waterfalls.

Other popular waterfalls in Kanyakumari District are Ullakaarvi falls, Vattaparai Falls and Kalikesam falls. All these falls are located in the Western Ghats.

Access 

Thirparappu Waterfalls is about 35 km from Nagercoil, the headquarters of Kanyakumari District, about 55 km from Kanyakumari town and about 52 km from Thiruvananthapuram city, the capital of Kerala.

References

 District Collector, Collectorate, Nagercoil 629001. "Official website of Kanyakumari District." Places of Tourist Interest

Waterfalls of Tamil Nadu